Art Canada Institute is a bilingual, non-profit research organization based out of Massey College, at the University of Toronto.  Through a variety of programs, such as the Massey Art Lecture Series and the Canadian Online Art Book Project, the Institute aims to promote and support the study of Canadian art history.

History 
Established in 2012, the non-governmental initiative Art Canada Institute arose out of Founder and Executive Director Sara Angel's concern over the lack of authoritative resources on Canadian art and artists available on the Internet.  A Trudeau Scholar and arts journalist with a background in publishing, Angel intended to address what she viewed as an absence of accessible and inclusive material on Canadian visual culture through the creation of the ACI, which has been described as "a comprehensive, multi-tiered, online-based resource for the general public on Canadian art history."

Angel gained the support of John Fraser, who was the master of Massey College in 2010, the year she began her PhD at the University of Toronto.  Fraser felt the ACI's goals were in harmony with Vincent Massey's vision of "the coming together of town and gown,"  and Fraser himself would later become the Institute's Founding Chair.

Angel continued to build support over the next year and a half, but it was only after she was named a Trudeau Foundation Doctoral Scholar and was awarded a generous grant, which she put towards the fledgling ACI, that the Institute became a reality.  Since that time the ACI has taken shape and acquired a board of directors, an institute advisory committee, a book project advisory committee, a commissioning editor and a list of over 50 contributing writers.

In its aim to create a central, online, and contemporary resource for Canadian art history, the Art Canada Institute has brought together art historians, curators, and visual culture experts in the creation of original scholarship that reflects "the people, themes and topics that have defined Canada's visual arts heritage."  The Institute is currently supported through private and corporate donations and is registered Canadian charity.

Programs

The Online Canadian Art Book Project 

In November 2013, the ACI launched its inaugural program the Online Canadian Art Book Project with the release of Jack Chambers: Life and Work by Mark Cheetham, the first in a series of free online e-books.  The project is encyclopedic in nature and meant for a general audience, with authors, who include art historians and curators from across Canada, contributing original scholarship that addresses subjective topics such as an artist's significance.

Intended to be accessible and inclusive each volume is published in English and French, and in multiple formats and all are freely available on the ACI website. Institutional partnerships with cultural heritage institutions across Canada afforded the ACI a wealth of material and every edition is well illustrated with reproductions of major works and archival objects, making materials that had been "hidden away in vaults or perhaps able to be seen only at specific galleries" available to a wider audience.

The artists in the series are usually considered "seminal figures in Canadian art,"  and include works by Joyce Wieland, Yves Gaucher, Pitseolak Ashoona, Prudence Heward and Harold Town. The Canadian Online Art Book Project also aims to address "holes in Canadian art history" by featuring artists absent from  the mainstream narrative. In an interview founder Angel explains that the ACI means to "redefine the canon" by providing "a balance between well-known artists, such as Michael Snow, and artists who should be household names but are not, such as Kathleen Munn," a painter who was highly respected in her time, but is now on the fringes of the Canadian art historical canon.

The ACI Massey Art Lecture Series 

Another way that the ACI fulfills their mandate to make "Canadian art history a contemporary conversation," is through its Lecture Series, which is open to the public and given by the authors of the online art books on the occasion of the publication of each new title. These lectures, which are held at Massey College University of Toronto, are videotaped and posted on the ACI website.

Other ACI Programs 
Other key pillars of ACI's programming include: The Canadian Art Library Series, The Canadian Schools Art Education Program, The Redefining Canadian Art History Fellowship Program, and the Art Canada Institute weekly newsletter.

The Canadian Art Library Series offers a selection of ACI's digital art books in a print format and up to four titles are published annually. Recent titles now available in print include Kent Monkman, Walter S. Allward, Iljuwas Bill Reid, Annie Pootoogook, and Mary Pratt.

Created to complement ACI's Canadian Online Art Book Project, The Canadian Schools Art Education Program provides expert-authored teacher resource guides for primary and secondary school educators to facilitate the study of a wide range of subjects through the work of Canadian artists. The program also offers Independent Student Learning Activities, which can be distributed directly to students and support learning online and at home. All content is open-source, available to audiences free of charge in both English and French.

In 2022 ACI launched The Redefining Canadian Art History Fellowship Program to create a more inclusive art history by supporting studies on Canadian and Indigenous artists whose lives and works are underrepresented. Over the next five years beginning in 2022, this initiative will award five grants of $30,000 to five scholars each June. The inaugural research fellows were announced in June 2022.

ACI's weekly Friday newsletter keeps readers informed of the organization's latest programming, and offers curated selections of Canadian artworks that illuminate current events in the art world and beyond as well as significant moments in Canadian history.

References

External links 
 Art Canada Institute

Educational organizations based in Ontario
Charities based in Canada
Research institutes in Canada
Organizations based in Toronto